Amdo railway station is the Qinghai–Tibet Railway station in Amdo County, Nagchu, Tibet, China.

With an elevation of 4,702 m, Amdo station is believed to be the highest altitude railway station in the world. Serving the township of Pana, seat of Amdo County, the station is also one of the highest railway station with a regular passenger service schedule: two passenger services are available at this station each day.

Station layout 

The station has a crossing loop and several goods sidings adjacent to the passenger station.

See also 
 Amdo
 List of stations on Qinghai–Tibet railway
 List of highest railways in the world

References

Stations on the Qinghai–Tibet Railway
Railway stations in Tibet
Amdo